The 1978 New South Wales Open, also known by its sponsored name Marlboro New South Wales Open, was a combined men's and women's tennis tournament played on outdoor grass courts at the White City Stadium in Sydney, Australia. The men's event was part of the 1978 Colgate-Palmolive Grand Prix circuit while the women's event was art of the 1979 Colgate Series. It was the 86th edition of the event and was held from 18 December through 24 December 1978. The singles titles were won by unseeded Tim Wilkison and second-seeded Dianne Fromholtz.

Finals

Men's singles
 Tim Wilkison defeated  Kim Warwick 6–3, 6–3, 6–7, 3–6, 6–2

Women's singles
 Dianne Fromholtz defeated  Wendy Turnbull 6–2, 7–5

Men's doubles
 Hank Pfister /  Sherwood Stewart defeated  Syd Ball /  Bob Carmichael 6–4, 6–4

Women's doubles
 Lesley Hunt /  Sharon Walsh defeated  Ilana Kloss /  Marise Kruger 6–2, 6–1

References

External links
 Official website
 Association of Tennis Professionals (ATP) tournament profile
 Women's Tennis Association (WTA) tournament profile
 Women's Tennis Association (WTA) tournament event details
 International Tennis Federation (ITF) men's tournament event details 

Sydney International
New South Wales Open
New South Wales Open
New South Wales Open, 1978